New Adventures of Alice  is a novel by John Rae, written in 1917 and published by P. F. Volland of Chicago. It is, according to Carolyn Sigler, one of the more important "Alice imitations", or novels inspired by Lewis Carroll's Alice books.

The book opens with a little girl, Betsy, wishing for another Alice book. She passes into a dream, and finds in the attic a book which begins with Alice reading Mother Goose rhymes to her kittens, leading to further adventures.

The book features black-and-white line drawings as well as colour plates by the author, who was known for his portraits of Carl Sandburg and Albert Einstein.

Bibliography
Rae, John (2010) New Adventures of Alice. Evertype.

Notes

 

1917 American novels
1917 children's books
1917 fantasy novels
American fantasy novels
American children's novels
Children's fantasy novels
Books based on Alice in Wonderland